Hutt River is a river in the Mid West region of Western Australia.

The main tributary for the Hutt River is Kennedy Creek. Others are Yarder Gully and Swamp Gully, which are important contributors of fresh water to the river.

Under normal flow, the Hutt River runs to the north for less than  before breaking through the final dune and flowing to the sea. Under heavy flow it breaks straight through.

Similar to Lake MacLeod, north of Carnarvon, Hutt Lagoon is fed by marine waters through a barrier ridge and by meteoric waters through springs. Due to the salina's below sea-level position, seepage of seawater into the salina is continuous year round.

History
His crew explored the area, and two mutineers, Wouter Loos and Jan Pelgrom de Bye, appear to have been abandoned here, becoming Australia's first European residents.

The first British explorer to encounter Hutt River was Lieutenant George Grey on 5 April 1839, naming the river after his friend William Hutt. Hutt was a British Liberal politician who was heavily involved in the colonization of Western Australia, New Zealand and South Australia, and the brother of John Hutt, the second Governor of Western Australia. Hutt was for a time chairman of the Western Australian Land Company. The next day, Grey named the nearby Bowes River after Hutt's wife, Mary Bowes.

The Principality of Hutt River was a micronation located midway along the river. It was not recognised by Australian state or federal governments, or any other country. It dissolved in August 2020.

References

Rivers of the Mid West region